Walcz o Swoją Wolność is an album put out by the Polish punk rock band Abaddon.

Track listing
"Koniec swiata"
"Zamknij sie w sobie"
"Walcz o swoja wolnosc"
"Boimy sie siebie"
"Kto"
"Kukly"

Personnel
Tomasz Lutek Frost - bass guitar
Bernard Beniu Szafrański - guitar
Tomasz Perełka Dorn - drums
Waldemar Kiki Jedyczkowski - vocals

Resources
http://homepages.nyu.edu/~cch223/poland/albums/abaddon_walczoswojawolnosc.html, URL accessed at 31 August 2006

1996 albums
Abaddon (band) albums